Dick van Dijk (born 20 May 1970) is a Dutch former professional darts player who played in Professional Darts Corporation (PDC) events.

Career
Van Dijk reached the last 32 of the 2003 Winmau World Masters, beating former world champion Tony David in the first round, then losing to Martin Atkins. In 2005, he won the WDF World Cup, beating Per Laursen in the final. He followed this with a disappointing first round exit at the World Masters, losing to the unknown Swede Bo Larsson. Since then his form has declined, losing in the Last 32 Group Stage of the 2006 International Darts League and the first round of the World Masters, losing to future World Champion Mark Webster.

In April 2007, van Dijk played in the PDC Open Holland Masters, reaching the last 32 and earning £150. He played in another PDC ranked tournament in the Netherlands, playing in two PDPA Players Championship in Eindhoven, winning only £75. Despite these appearances, van Dijk has not yet applied for PDPA membership and remains a WDF/BDO player. He was invited to participate in the 2007 Winmau World Masters but had to withdraw due to bypass surgery.

Van Dijk was unsuccessful in his attempts to qualify for 2009 BDO World Darts Championship. In 2009 he reached the semi-finals of the unranked Vonderke Masters and then reached the last 16 of the Dutch Open. He failed to qualify for the 2010 BDO World Darts Championship and suffered a first round exit in the 2009 World Masters. He then played in three PDC events in the Netherlands and Germany without earning money in the events.

Career finals

WDF major finals: 1 (1 title)

References

External links
 Player profile on Darts Database

1970 births
Living people
Dutch darts players
Sportspeople from The Hague
Professional Darts Corporation former tour card holders